Jajang Paliama is an Indonesian footballer who plays as a midfielder.

Career
On November 3, 2014, he was released by Semen Padang.

Honours

Club honours
Persibo Bojonegoro
 Liga Indonesia Premier Division: 2009-10
 Piala Indonesia: 2012

Semen Padang
 Indonesian Community Shield: 2013

References

External links 
 Profile
 

Indonesian footballers
Living people
1984 births
People from Kediri (city)
Indonesia international footballers
PS Mojokerto Putra players
Persid Jember players
Gresik United players
Persibo Bojonegoro players
Semen Padang F.C. players
Indonesian Premier Division players
Liga 1 (Indonesia) players
Association football midfielders
Sportspeople from East Java